Suraram is a locality in Qutbullapur suburb of Hyderabad, India. It falls under Medchal-Malkajgiri district of Telangana. It is administered as Ward No. 129 of Greater Hyderabad Municipal Corporation.

Transport
Suraram is well connected by TSRTC buses, they are

/283c suraram To Secunderabad via suchitra & Dairyfarm
283 C suraram To Secunderabad via Balanagar, Bowenpally
283 D suraram To CBS via Balanagar & Punjagutta
283 I suraram To MGBS via Balanagar & Ameerpet
29B/283 N suraram to Secundrabad via Saibaba nagar Balanagar, Bowenpally
289 M to Mehdipatnam
283 v\s suraram To Secunderabad via Balanagar, Bowenpally
230 [All extensions goes up to dundigal] via suraram X road
272 [All extensions goes up to GandiMaisamma] via suraram X road
498 from Jinnaram to Sec-bad via suraram X road
511 from Narsapur to Balanagar
 Medak, Bhansuvada, Boddhan district services are also pass through this way

References

External links
APSRTC Buses Timetable 

Medchal–Malkajgiri district
Municipal wards of Hyderabad, India